The Kenya High School is a public girls' high school located on Mandera Road in the upmarket Kileleshwa suburb of Westlands Sub-County in Kenya's capital city, Nairobi.

The school, which follows the national curriculum, is one of Kenya's 112 national schools and also one of the 18 prestigious Cluster III secondary schools. Located on a 150-acre campus some six Km from the Central Business District, the institution caters for 1500+ students who attend Forms 1-4 (= US grades 9-12) in seven streams, at the end of which the students sit for the Kenya Certificate of Secondary Education (KCSE) exams.
It is primarily a boarding school and accepts day-scholars on a case-by-case basis.
The Kenya High School consistently performs well in national secondary exams, and has enforced a proper code of conduct to be followed by all.

Background and History

Education in the East Africa Protectorate began in October 1904, with the appointment of Mr A. J. Turner, of the Indian Educational Deptartment, as Headmaster of the Railway School, Nairobi. At that time there were few Europeans in the country, and education was only required for the children of European, Eurasian and Indian employees on the Uganda Railway. In 1910, the Board of Education proceeded to separate the provision for European, Indian, Arab and African education, and a separate European School was founded under Mr A. J. Turner, The European School, Nairobi. This co-education primary school marks the beginnings of The Kenya High School. 1910 is considered the birth year of present day Kenya High School.

The school opened with 110 children and gradually increased the number until it obtained its maximum of about 250 children in 1918. It started in buildings on the former Police Barracks adjacent to Government House on Nairobi Hill, which is the location of the present-day Nairobi Primary School. About 130 boarders were accommodated in new buildings of timber and iron sheets two miles away, by the old Buller’s camp next to Nairobi Club. In keeping with the government’s then commitment to improving education in Kenya, 25 acres of land on the Hill were allocated for new buildings. The architect, Sir Herbert Baker, drew up the design, and in 1928 a fine set of spacious new buildings was ready for occupation.

In 1930, when the colonial government initiated the classification of secondary schools, the European School Nairobi was the only one accorded this status in the whole country, while the rest of the schools remained primary and feeder schools. It was then that the genders were separated, and the secondary girls moved to the upper floor of the school, while using Pillared Hall for assembly.  The headmaster, Captain Bertram William Lothian Nicholson, is credited as the originator of the girls' schools' motte, Servire Est Regnare (To Serve Is To Reign).

In 1931 the boys' secondary school was moved to a 600-acre allotment in the Kabete area (along Sclater’s Road, today's Waiyaki Way). It was named Prince of Wales School (now Nairobi School) leaving the girls behind with the primary school pupils. Along with Lenana School, Nairobi School has always been referred to as The Kenya High School's brother school, as the two schools have maintained a cordial relationship over the years by inviting each other to their school events and sports galas.

In 1935, the school was renamed The European Girls' Secondary School and had its first Headmistress, Miss Kerby, appointed. In 1951, the school moved to new buildings in Kileleshwa, which had been constructed at an (for that time) astronomical cost of £700,000 (excluding the chapel, pool and library) through Miss Kerby's connection to colonial administrators. At this point, it got its current name, The Kenya High School, and was modelled on the English public school and grammar school tradition.

The first ethnic African girl to be admitted in 1961 was Ann Mithamo. In 1974 the school was taken over by the government and it began to admit more African pupils and teachers. Pamela Ogot joined the faculty in May 1965 as the first ethnic African teacher, while the first ethnic African Headmistress, Mrs Rose Kariuki, served from January to July 1977, then handed over to Mrs. Margaret Wanjohi who went on to lead the school until 1999. It was during Mrs Wanjohi's tenure that she was also promoted as the first female Principal of a Kenyan institution. The first woman to serve on the Board of Governors (now known as the Board of Management) was Dr. Eddah Gachukia (1984 - 1988). Following the establishment of three Secondary School Principals’ grades in the 2018 Career Progression Guidelines by the Teachers Service Commission (TSC), the school's first headteacher to acquire the title of Chief Principal was Mrs Flora Mulatya.

The longest-serving staff member is Mrs. Rebecca Munyeke Kithyoma, who served as school secretary from 1971 to 2019.

As part of The Three, The Kenya High School is one of the oldest schools of the former East Africa Protectorate government's European Secondary Boarding Schools, along with Nairobi School (formerly Prince of Wales School) and Lenana School (formerly Duke of York School).
All three schools still retain some English/British traditions handed down from the colonial settler era.

Admission and Performance
As a national school, The Kenya High School admits girls from across Kenya's 47 counties who have performed exceptionally well in the national Kenya Certificate of Primary Education (KCPE) examination.
Annual enrolment has steadily increased over the years, from around 800 up to the late 1980s/early 1990s to over 1500 as of 2022. The high numbers are a result of Kenya adopting the Policy on Universal Access to Basic Education, which seeks to ensure that all children enrol in primary school and complete their secondary school education with a 100% transition rate.

As one of the best public schools in the country, The Kenya High School consistently posts excellent results, often topping the national list of over 10,000 secondary schools:
 Number Two in KCSE 2016
 Number One in KCSE 2019 with 76 students scoring straight As
 Number Two in KCSE 2020 with 64 As
 Number Four in KSCE 2021 with 53 As

Houses
There are ten boarding houses which were originally named after notable women in European history and are now  mostly named after Kenyan geographical features and heritage sites. The houses, consisting of dormitories, cubicles and private rooms, are home to about 90% of these students for eight and a half months in a year. Each of the houses accommodates about 150 students; all from the four different class/form levels. The symmetrical architectural design of the school has two houses in each building except for the two in the middle (Nyali and Suswa), which are home to one house each.
Each house originally had its own house colours, which were reflected in the members' sports kits and tie pins, but this was phased out sometime in the 1970s. However, the house emblems still adorn the front facade of each house.
The area where the houses are located is known as down blocks by the students. The houses of residence are built next to each other in a semi-circular shape, clockwise from north to south as follows:
 Tausi (formerly Huxley), together with
 Sabaki (Kerby)
 Chania (Beale), together with
 Yala (Nightingale)
 Nyali (Mortimer)
 Suswa (Mitchell)
 Sagana (Hamilton), together with
 Naivasha (Bronte)
 Mara (Curie), together with
 Baden Powell has retained its name, and is often referred to by its acronym, BP
Phased out day-scholar houses include:
 Tsavo (Northcote)
 Galana (Darling)
 Amboseli (Stott)
There is a resident matron (housemistress) for every block (two boarding houses) except Nyali and Suswa, which each have their own matron. Matrons are generally responsible for welfare and disciplinary matters in their individual houses.

Facilities
Tuition takes place "up-school" which consists of two rows of classrooms and some laboratories (junior and senior corridors). The two corridors are connected at the western tip by a quadrangle consisting of a lecture theatre and laboratories for biology, physics, chemistry and home science. The Computer Centre was later constructed behind the lecture theatre.

The school's own chapel, which was dedicated between the late 1950s and early 1960s, sits between the boarding houses and tuition blocks. With a two-level seating capacity, it houses a piano and a digital church organ, and has a unique architectural design in the form of a cross when viewed aerially.

While dining was previously catered for via the old dining hall (currently used for assemblies and other meetings), the school now has a recently constructed modern kitchen and dining complex, whose foundation stone was laid by then President Uhuru Kenyatta in May 2018. This hospitality space was constructed with Ksh 7 million in government funds, was officially commissioned in 2020 and can seat 2,500 students.

There is also a well-stocked library, and a Science & Technology Centre is in the planning, with Ksh 7 million already earmarked for its completion.

Installed by the late 1960s, the Art Studio and Music Room contain spaces for visual and performing arts, with the Music Room having several practice rooms each equipped with a piano.

The sanatorium (The San) is the school's sickbay, which has a clinic and wards for in-patient treatment. It is managed by two qualified personnel (nurses) on 12-hour shifts. Additionally, a physician is also on call in the event of any complication to give directions and consultancy services to the students. Architecturally, it is interestingly a near-replica of the Lenana School sanatorium.

For sports, the campus is equipped with a 33-metre swimming pool, a gymnasium, several field hockey pitches and an athletics field, as well as tennis, basketball, netball and volleyball courts.

The school also has its own farm with cattle and crops.

The Kenya High School is also home to the country's first open-air theatre, The Oenone Theatre, named after a former student, Oenone Grellier (1922 - 1944) who passed away in a swimming accident.

Legend has it that, in recognition of the "grade-level wealth" encircled within its fences, the school came to be known and The Heifer Boma, later simply Boma, with the students gaining the nickname Bomarians.
Another version tells that the school has been affectionately known as a Boma (of heifers) in reference to a “herd” of young girls who needed to be kept safely out of predators' way.

Architecture
Situated on Mandera Road off Gatundu Road in Kileleshwa, The Kenya High School is designed to a site plan resembling a mushroom, with the classrooms and administration block forming the stem and the dormitories forming the bloom. The chapel is centrally located symbolising God’s central role in the school.

The buildings are constructed to an early modern design with chisel dressed stone walls under a half-round Spanish tiled roof. Floors are finished in a variety of terazzo, parquet and cement screed. Doors are made of highly polished timber panels while windows are glazed in steel casements.

Extra lighting is provided by fixed glazed casements held in arched frames with ornamental brick infilling and rose windows. Considering their age, the buildings and the school grounds are in an excellent state of repair and decoration.

Management
The Kenya High School has various levels charged with managing the school.
 The Board of Management (BoM)
 The Administration
 The Parents-Teachers Association (PTA)
 The Students' Council

Board of Management
Formerly termed Board of Governors, the current Board of Management (BoM) consists of the following members:
 Mr. Philip G. Njuki (Chairperson)
 Mrs. Virginia Wahome (Secretary)
 Justice (Rtd) Lee  G. Muthoga
 Ms. Lily K. Musinga
 Dr. Penninah Gasheri Mugao
 Eng. Philip Gichuki
 Mr. James Muieti Mutisya
 Mr. Moses Araka Nyakiongora
 Mr. Enosh Onyango Momanyi
 Mrs. Victoria Nzau
 Mr. Lawrence K. Wachira
 Mr. Philip Chirchir

Administration
The principals (the Chief and her deputies) are the main disciplinarians, and although minimal, academic faculty often have the upper hand in student discipline.

Parents-Teachers Association

Student Council
As per the 2008 national reforms in the education sector, The Kenya High School has a Student Council, whose members are elected from and by the student body, to enable participatory governance of the school, to represent students' views to the administration and to generally inculcate democratic and leadership skills. The Council is led by a chairperson who takes on the role of what was previously an appointed Head of School (Head Girl).
Moreover, besides the matrons, disciplinary action in the dorms is up to the senior prefects (Heads of Houses/blue rags) and junior prefects (red rags).

Alumnae

Former students of school (Ex-Bomarians) are organised under The Kenya High School Alumnae Society (until 2022, The Kenya High School Old Girls' Association). The membership stretches way back to former attendees of the 1950s up to date, and is open to any alumna of the school.
Established upon the alma mater’s maxim “to serve is to reign,” the Society is a non-political, non-profit, voluntary sorority of members drawn from the alumnae of The Kenya High School for girls, with a mission to promote collaboration with the school and networking amongst members, while leaving a legacy of positive impact and sustainability.

Former and current Chairpersons include:
 2018-2020: Christine Rose Odera, deputised by Carole Osero Ageng’o
 2020-2022: Namunyak Kirorei, deputised by Joyce Mumina Gatambia
 2022-2024: Louise Nyamu-Steinbeck, deputised by Hope Wandera

Notable alumnae:

 Esther Arunga: Kenyan-Australian lawyer and former broadcasting presenter
 June Arunga: Kenyan property rights lawyer
 Margaret Benyon: British holography artist
 Nancy Gathungu, MBS: Auditor-General of Kenya
 Philippa Namutebi Kabali-Kagwa: Ugandan author, and life and personal coach
 Hilary La Fontaine: British intelligence officer
 Jean La Fontaine: British anthropologist and professor
 Dr Susan Mboya: Kenyan corporate executive, philanthropist and daughter of Tom Mboya
 Emma Miloyo: Kenyan architect, first female president of the Architectural Association of Kenya
 Wavinya Ndeti: Kenyan, second governor of Machakos County
 Christine Nicholls: British author
 Lady Justice Njoki Susanna Ndung'u: Kenyan associate justice of The Supreme Court of Kenya
 Esther Nyaiyaki: Kenyan lawyer and Judiciary registrar
 Dr Auma Obama: Kenyan-British community activist, sociologist, journalist, author and half-sister of Barack Obama
 Amina Abdi Rabar: Kenyan TV and radio presenter
 Judy Thongori: Kenyan lawyer and rights activist
 Roselinda Soipan Tuiya: Kenyan Cabinet Secretary for Environment and Sanitation

A number of Ivy League and Oxbridge graduates completed their secondary school education at The Kenya High School, such as:
 Carol Musyoka: Cornell Law School
 Adema Sangale: Harvard Kennedy School and Chevening scholar at University of Oxford

Headteachers
 1935 - 1942: Miss Grace Kerby
 1942 - 1963: Miss J. A. M. Stott
 1963 - 1967: Miss Adrienne Leevers (a former Liberal politician from Hornsey, UK)
 1967 - 1977: Miss Vaudine Marguerite Barnes (1929 - 2006, daughter of Rev. L. A. Barnes of Wellington, New Zealand)
 January - July 1977: Mrs Rose Kariuki
 July 1977 - August 1999: Mrs Margaret Wanjohi, HSC (later director of Starehe Girls' Centre)
 September 1999 - July 2015: Mrs Rosemary Saina HSC (later member of the Kenya National Examinations Council KNEC)
 January 2016 - December 2022: Mrs Flora Mulatya, OGW MBS (current Education Attaché in Canberra at Kenya's diplomatic mission to Australia
 January 2023 to date: Mrs Virginia Wahome (immediate former Principal at Bishop Gatimu Ngandu Girls High School)

References

External links 
 http://www.kenyahigh.ac.ke/home.html
 KHS Alumnae Society's LinkedIn Page

Schools in Nairobi
Girls' schools in Kenya